The Sherbrook Apartments, 600-604 Walnut Ave., Syracuse, New York, designed by Ward Wellington Ward,
were listed on the National Register of Historic Places in 1997.

See also 
 Walnut Park Historic District

References

Buildings and structures in Syracuse, New York
Apartment buildings in New York (state)
National Register of Historic Places in Syracuse, New York
Residential buildings on the National Register of Historic Places in New York (state)
Residential buildings completed in 1914